The British Rail Class 487 electric multiple units were built by English Electric in 1940, for use on the Waterloo & City line.

Twelve motor carriages (DMBSO), numbered 51–62, and sixteen trailers (TSO), numbered 71–86, were built. Trains were in various formations, from a single motor carriage, to pairs of motor cars with up to three intermediate trailers.

They were originally classified Class 453 under TOPS but were later reclassified Class 487.

The Waterloo & City line was operated as part of the BR Southern Region. Stock was painted in British Railways green livery, which was replaced by Rail Blue in the 1970s, a version of all over blue with grey detailing. In 1986, the line came under the ownership of Network SouthEast, and their blue, red and white livery was applied.

The Class 487 units were unique on the British Rail network for a couple of reasons.  They did not feature the normal yellow ends because the route they operated was entirely in tunnels where the darkness would render them pointless and the line did not integrate at all with the rest of the network.  The units were only fitted with red lights at the ends, thus the front of the train displayed two red lights instead of the more usual white.

By the 1990s the units were urgently in need of replacing. This came in the form of new Class 482 two-car units, which were delivered to traffic in 1992/93. The final Class 487 vehicles were taken by road to Glasgow for scrap, which was their single longest journey above ground. One vehicle, DMBSO no. 61, was initially stored at the National Railway Museum in York, before being transferred to the London Transport Museum's Acton Depot. This vehicle has had a major internal and external restoration by the London Transport Museum to have it in the condition it was on the day it left service in 1993.

Gallery

Fleet Details

References

Further reading

External links

WC
487
Train-related introductions in 1940